The Brothers Four is an American folk singing group, founded in 1957 in Seattle, Washington, and known for their 1960 hit song "Greenfields."

History
Bob Flick, John Paine, Mike Kirkland, and Dick Foley met at the University of Washington, where they were members of the Phi Gamma Delta fraternity in 1956 (hence the "Brothers" appellation).  Their first professional performances were the result of a prank played on them in 1958 by a rival fraternity, who had arranged for someone to call them, pretend to be from Seattle's Colony Club, and invite them to come down to audition for a gig. Even though they were not expected at the club, they were allowed to sing a few songs and were subsequently hired. Flick recalls them being paid "mostly in beer".

They left for San Francisco in 1959, where they met Mort Lewis, Dave Brubeck's manager.  Lewis became their manager and later that year secured them a contract with Columbia Records.  Their second single, "Greenfields", released in January 1960, hit No. 2 on the pop chart, sold over one million copies and was awarded a gold disc by the RIAA. Their first album, The Brothers Four, released toward the end of the year, made the top 20.  Other highlights of their early career included singing their fourth single, "The Green Leaves of Summer", from the John Wayne movie The Alamo, at the 1961 Academy Awards, and having their third album, BMOC/Best Music On/Off Campus, go top 10.  They also recorded the title song for the Hollywood film Five Weeks in a Balloon in 1962 and the theme song for the ABC television series Hootenanny, "Hootenanny Saturday Night", in 1963.  They also gave "Sloop John B" a try, released as "The John B Sails".

The British Invasion and the ascendance of edgier folk rock musicians such as Bob Dylan put an end to the Brothers Four's early period of success, but they kept performing and making records, doing particularly well in Japan and on the American hotel circuit.

The group, with Jerry Dennon, built a radio station in Seaside, Oregon (KSWB) in 1968. The station was subsequently sold in 1972 to a group from Montana, and later to a self-proclaimed minister, and finally merged into a larger conglomerate of radio stations.

The group attempted a comeback by recording a highly commercial version of Dylan's "Mr. Tambourine Man", but were unable to release it due to licensing issues, and The Byrds eventually stole their thunder by releasing their heralded version.

Mike Kirkland left the group in 1969 and was replaced by Mark Pearson, another University of Washington alumnus. In 1971, Pearson left and was replaced by Bob Haworth, who stayed until 1985 and was replaced by a returning Pearson. Dick Foley left the group in 1990 and was replaced by Terry Lauber. Despite all the changes and having spent  years in the business, the group is still active.

Mike Kirkland died of cancer on August 20, 2020, at age 82.

Selected discography

Albums
1960   The Brothers Four – U.S. No. 11
1960   Rally 'Round!
1961   B.M.O.C. (Best Music On/Off Campus) – US No. 4
1961   Roamin' with the Brothers IV
1961   The Brothers Four Song Book – US No. 71
1962   The Brothers Four: In Person – Columbia 360 Sound CS-8628 - US No. 102
1962   The Brothers Four Greatest Hits
1963   Cross-Country Concert – US No. 81
1963   The Big Folk Hits – US No. 56
1964   More Big Folk Hits – US No. 134
1964   Sing of Our Times
1965   The Honey Wind Blows – US No. 118
1965   By Special Request
1966   Try to Remember – US No. 76
1966   A Beatles' Songbook (The Brothers Four sing Lennon/McCartney) – US No. 97
1966   Merry Christmas
1967   A New World's Record
1969   Let's Get Together
1970   1970
1996   Greenfields & Other Gold – new studio recording
1996   The Tokyo Tapes - 35th Anniversary – live cd
2010   Golden (50th) Anniversary – live cd
2014   Beautiful World – new studio and live cd
2018   The Very Best of the Brothers Four: Renewal

Singles

See also
List of University of Washington people
List of people from Seattle
List of folk musicians
Ringing Bell

References

External links
 Official website

American folk musical groups
Columbia Records artists
Fantasy Records artists
Musical groups established in 1957
Musical groups from Seattle
Musical groups from Washington (state)
1957 establishments in Washington (state)